573 may refer to:
 573 (number), a number
 573, the year 573 AD
 Area code 573, an area code in Missouri, U.S.

Other uses
 The video game company Konami is represented by the number 573.